Kungstensgymnasiet (KSG) is an upper secondary school from the 10th–12th grade in Vasastan in Stockholm, Sweden. The school is located in Stockholm University's former main building of Kungstensgatan 45. The school is now run by Folkuniversitetet and can accommodate about 400 pupils divided into two programs, Political Science with social science orientation. Program indentations are the economy (2000–2010), entrepreneurship, culture and language, and arts program with photo and language targeting. The school focuses on an interdisciplinary project.

In 2009 Kungstensgymnasiet was Sweden's fourth most searched secondary school with an intake limit of 295 points on the Social Science program.

Kungstensgymnasiet has an international profile and provide all students undertaking internship in Barcelona, Aix-en-Provence and Düsseldorf. All students study languagesup to step 5; step 6 can be made optional.

External links
Official website

Schools in Stockholm
Education in Stockholm
Gymnasiums (school) in Sweden